Zaeelii(written in the coin as ΖΑΙΕΛΕΩΝ) is the name of an ancient tribe in Northern Greece(Thraco-Macedonian regions in the Pangaean district) known only from silver coins bearing the name made in circa 500-480 B.C.

References

External links 
  Zaeelii from the British Museum Catalog of Greek Coins

Macedonia (ancient kingdom)
Ancient Greece